Henry William Lett  (4 December 1836, Hillsborough, County Down – 26 December 1920, Aghaderg)  was an  Irish  botanist who specialised in mosses.

Lett was educated at Trinity College. He was Canon of Dromore and a Member of the Belfast Natural History Society and a Member of the Royal Irish Academy.

Works
The most significant are
Lett, H. W. 1912. Musci and Hepaticae. Clare Island Survey, parts 11, 1Z: Proc. Roy. Irish Acad., 13, 1–18.
Lett, H. W. 1915. Census Report on the Mosses of Ireland. Proc. Roy. Irish Acad., 32, B, 65–166.

References
 Robert Lloyd Praeger Some Irish naturalists: A Biographical Note-book W.Tempest, Dundalgan Press, Dundalk, 1949 online here

External links
Henry William Lett
Henry William Lett Herbarium, biography, bibliography
Herbaria United digital images of 77 herbarium specimens collected by Rev. Henry William Lett

19th-century Irish botanists
1836 births
1920 deaths
Bryologists